Atlantic–Pacific or Atlantic/Pacific can refer to:
 Atlantic Avenue/Pacific Street station of the New York City Subway
 The Great Atlantic & Pacific Tea Company
 Atlantic and Pacific Railroad